PVPA may refer to:

 Pioneer Valley Performing Arts Charter Public School
 Plant Variety Protection Act